The following is a list of places with Morrison in their name.

 Morrison (disambiguation), any place which can simply be called Morrison
 Morrison Bluff, Arkansas, USA
 Morrison Bridge, a bridge in Portland, Oregon
 Morrison County, Minnesota, USA
 Morrison Cove, a valley in central Pennsylvania, USA
 Morrison Formation, a fossil strata in the Dinosaur National Monument, USA
 Morrison House (disambiguation), various
 Morrison Hill, in Hong Kong, China
 Morrison Hill Road, Hong Kong, China
 Morrison Landing, Ontario, Canadian municipality
 Morrison Lake (disambiguation), various
 Morrison Observatory, an astronomical observatory in Fayette, Missouri, USA
 Morrison Ranch, Agoura Hills, California, USA
 Morrison Road, Perth, Western Australia
 Morrison Stadium, a soccer stadium in Omaha, Nebraska, USA
 Morrison/SW 3rd Avenue (MAX station), IMAX light rail station, Portland, Oregon, USA
 Morrison Avenue – Soundview (IRT Pelham Line), New York City Subway station, USA
 Morrison-Rockwood State Park, Illinois, USA
 Mount Morrison, the name of several mountains
 Alexander Morrison National Park, in Western Australia
 Wangfujing, a street in Beijing, China, formerly called Morrison Street

See also
 Morrison shelter, a type of air-raid shelter
 Morrisons Hill, New South Wales, (1908-1975), Australian railway station
 Morissen, a municipality of Surselva, Switzerland